Mariano Azaña (1896–1965) was a Spanish film actor.

Partial filmography

 El milagro del Cristo de la Vega (1941)
 Primer amor (1942)
 ¿Por qué vivir tristes? (1942)
 Todo por ellas (1942)
 Schottis (1943)
 Hace cien años (1952)
 Segundo López (1953) - Podólogo
 Younger Brother (1953)
 I Was a Parish Priest (1953) - Fermín - el cartero
 The Other Life of Captain Contreras (1955) - George Hernández Piñada
 Miracle of Marcelino (1955) - Fray Malo - Brother Bad
 Afternoon of the Bulls (1956) - Julián
 Uncle Hyacynth (1956) - Cerillero
 Manolo guardia urbano (1956) - Capitán
 Pasión en el mar (1957) - Viejo marinero
 The Little Nightingale (1957) - Martín - el sacristán
 ...Y eligió el infierno (1957) - Párroco
 Historias de Madrid (1958) - El propietario del inmueble
 Carlota (1958)
 Las de Caín (1959) - Segismundo Caín y de la Muela
 Where Are You Going, Alfonso XII? (1959) - Gobernador
 El Salvador (1959)
 Back to the Door (1959) - Alvarito
 Maria, Registered in Bilbao (1960) - Consignatario de Málaga
 My Street (1960) - Trigo
 Fray Escoba (1961) - Fray Cirilo
 The Mustard Grain (1962) - Matilla
 A Nearly Decent Girl (1963) - Manolo
 Como dos gotas de agua (1963) - Juez Agustín Palacio
 Isidro el labrador (1964)
 La Dama de Beirut (1965) - (final film role)

References

Bibliography
 Florentino Soria. José María Forqué. Editora Regional de Murcia, 1990.

External links

 1896 births
 1965 deaths
 Spanish male film actors
 People from Madrid